The 2023 season is Rosenborg's 44th consecutive year in the top flight now known as Eliteserien, their 55th season in the top flight of Norwegian football. They will participate in Eliteserien, 2022–23 Cup, 2023 Cup and the Europa Conference League entering at the Second Qualifying round.This will be Kjetil Rekdal's second season as Rosenborg manager.

Squad

Transfers

Winter

In:

Out:

Summer

In:

Out:

Friendlies

Competitions

Eliteserien

Results summary

Results by round

Results

Table

Norwegian Cup 2022–23

Norwegian Cup 2023

Squad statistics

Appearances and goals

|-
|colspan="14"|Players away from Rosenborg on loan:
|-

|-
|colspan="14"|Players who appeared for Rosenborg no longer at the club:
|-
|}

Disciplinary record

See also
Rosenborg BK seasons

References 

2023
Rosenborg